The Hail Mary is a traditional Christian prayer addressing Mary, mother of Jesus.

Hail Mary may also refer to:

Stage and screen
 Hail Mary (film), a 1985 film written and directed by Jean-Luc Godard
 Hail, Mary!, a 1970 Soviet film
 The Hail Mary (Outlander), season 2 episode 12 number 26 in 2016 of the TV series Outlander

Music
 Hail Mary (Dark New Day album), 2013
 Hail Mary (Iwrestledabearonce album), 2015
 "Hail Mary" (Dark New Day song), off the eponymous album Hail Mary (Dark New Day album), 2013
 "Hail Mary" (2Pac song), off the album The Don Killuminati: The 7 Day Theory, 1997
 "Hail Mary" (Mark Owen song), off the album How the Mighty Fall, 2005

Other uses
 Hail Mary English Medium School, Perumpally, Emakulam, Kerala, India
 Hail Mary pass, in American football, a long forward pass made in desperation near the end of a game, and related uses
 Hail Mary, a fictional spaceship from the novel Project Hail Mary

See also

Hail Mary Cloud, a computing cloud composed of a botnet for password cracking
Hail Mary of Gold (Catholicism)
Project Hail Mary, a 2021 science-fiction novel by Andy Weir
Three Hail Marys (Roman Catholicism)
Ave Maria (disambiguation)

Hail (disambiguation)
Mary (disambiguation)